My Brother Jack is a classic 1964 Australian novel by writer George Johnston. It is part of a trilogy centering on the character of David Meredith. The other books in the trilogy are Clean Straw for Nothing and A Cartload of Clay. Its text is commonly studied for many English literature subjects in Australia.

Overview
This semi-autobiographical novel, definable as a roman à clef, follows the narrator, David Meredith, through his childhood and adolescence in interwar Melbourne through to adulthood and his prominent career as a journalist during World War II, to his life on a Greek island in the 1950s and 60s.

David's childhood and early life are influenced heavily by the destructive presence of his father, psychologically ruined by his experiences in the Great War. His father, cruel, increasingly withdrawn, is a catalyst for the escapes which both David and Jack have to make, each in their own way.

The novel has a central theme using contrasts between David and his older and more "typically Australian", brother, Jack. Where David is tentative, even passive, as a boy, Jack is fearless, engaging head-on with the world around him. "You've got to have a go, nipper," Jack says to David early in the novel.

As they get older, Jack exhibits solid qualities of loyalty and grit while David betrays friendships and family in his progress to success.

David's friend at The Morning Post in Melbourne, Gavin Turley, sums up this aspect of David's character, and indeed the journey the book describes, in Chapter 12. First in a comment to Helen:

And later in explanation to David himself:

The life of David Meredith has many parallels with the life of his creator, George Johnston. They were contemporaries, both growing up in the interwar years in suburban Melbourne, in families tainted by the horror of war, both finding writing to be their métiers. Both had short first marriages, both fell in love with younger women who became second wives, both had successful careers as war correspondents. Both lived bohemian lives on a Greek island. And of course, both had a brother called Jack.

In reviewing the novel in 2014, fifty years after its original publication, Paul Daley in The Guardian asks the reader to "look beyond the obvious autobiography and the family roman à clef, and discover the novel’s real strength – a daring iconoclasticism that challenges pervasive assumptions about Australian character, values and suburban complacency."

Awards and nominations
My Brother Jack won the Miles Franklin Award in 1964.

1965 TV series
The book was serialised for ABC in 1965 by Charmian Clift, who was also Johnston's wife.  It featured actors Ed Devereaux, Nick Tate and Richard Meikle.

2001 TV series
It was adapted again in 2001 by John Alsop and Sue Smith. The cast included William McInnes, Angie Milliken, Claudia Karvan and Jack Thompson, with Simon Lyndon, Matt Day as the brothers.

The series has been released on DVD by Umbrella Entertainment as a two-part film, packaged as "Great Aussie Icons: Jack Thompson" with Bad Blood as a second disc in the package.

References

External links
My Brother Jack 2001 mini-series at Australian Screen Online
My Brother Jack 1965 series at IMDb

1964 Australian novels
Miles Franklin Award-winning works
Novels about journalists
Novels set in the interwar period
Novels set in Melbourne
William Collins, Sons books
Novels set during World War II
Australian autobiographical novels